Darren Paul Treacy (born 6 September 1979) is an English former professional footballer who played in the Football League as a midfielder.

References

1970 births
Living people
Footballers from Lambeth
English footballers
Association football midfielders
Bradford City A.F.C. players
Millwall F.C. players
English Football League players